Robin Clidro (1545–1580) was a Welsh language poet and itinerant minstrel from Denbighshire, North Wales.

Few details are available about Clidro’s life. His surviving work is characterised by a lighter tone, in contrast to the professional poets of his era.

See also
Robin Clidro at Wikisource

References
Robin Clidro at Welsh Biography online, http://yba.llgc.org.uk/AnaServer?ybawbo+0+start.anv

1545 births
1580 deaths